The 2014–15 season will be Frölunda HC's 35th season in Sweden's premier ice hockey league, the Swedish Hockey League (SHL; formerly named Elitserien).

Pre-season

Exhibition games log

Champions Hockey League

Summary

Standings

Games log

Swedish Hockey League

Summary

Standings

Games log

Statistics

Skaters

Transactions

References

External links
Frolundaindians.com — Official team website
SHL.se — Official league website
Swehockey.se — Official statistics website

2014-15
2014–15 SHL season